Karaahmetli is a village  in Mersin Province, Turkey.

Geography 

Karaahmetli is a village  in Erdemli district of Mersin Province. The population of the village was 322 as of 2012.

History 

The village was probably founded by a Turkmen tribe in the Middle Ages, and the name of the village refers to the founder of the village. But the vicinity of the village is full of early Byzantine religious ruins, and the village may be described as an open-air museum. Especially the ruins of a 5th- or 6th-century church now called Emirzeli is an important example of Byzantine architecture.

Economy 

Animal husbandry, which once constituted the major economic sector of the village, is on the decline. The main agricultural crops are tomato, cucumber, olive and some fruits. Although the village hosts valuable archeological sites, at the moment, tourism plays no part in the village's economy.

References

External links
For images

Villages in Erdemli District